This is a list of years in Iceland. See also the timeline of Icelandic history.

9th century

10th century

11th century

12th century

13th century

14th century

15th century

16th century

17th century

18th century

19th century

20th century

21st century

See also
Timeline of Icelandic history

Years in Iceland
Iceland history-related lists
Iceland